Hawaii Route 61, often called the Pali Highway, is in Honolulu County, Hawaii, United States, that is the main highway connecting downtown Honolulu with the windward side of Oahu island. From downtown, it traverses up Nuuanu Valley and the residential neighborhood of Nuuanu,  passes through the Nuuanu Pali Tunnels, and descends to the major windward communities of Kāneohe (reached by Kamehameha Highway, State Route 83) and Kailua.

History
The current Pali Highway is actually the third roadway to be built here. The original Pali "highway" went along much of the same route and portions of the old road still exist, although closed to vehicular traffic. When the current Pali Highway and its tunnels opened, the original roadway was closed and is now used by hikers.  The "Old Pali Highway", as it is now called, is noted in the popular culture of Hawaii for being a place with strong spiritual connections. Many ghost stories have settings along this old highway.  A large portion of the old highway was built over the ancient Hawaiian foot paths that traversed the famous Pali pass, which was the most easily accessible route to take from the Windward to Honolulu side. This was because much of the Koolau range on the Windward side has steep cliffs that make it nearly impossible to traverse over safely. "Pali" is the Hawaiian word for precipice.

The highway was mentioned as an "awe-inspiring drive" in Car and Driver's "10 Best Drivers' Cities."

Points of interest
The lower mouth of Nuuanu valley is the site of historic Oahu Cemetery, founded in 1844. Over time it was expanded with the Royal Mausoleum of Hawaii in 1863, and the Kyoto Gardens of Honolulu Memorial Park. A few blocks to the east is the National Memorial Cemetery of the Pacific.

Hawaii Route 61 has several free scenic lookouts, including the Pali Lookout.  The Queen Emma Summer Palace is also on the Pali (2913 Pali Hwy).  The following foreign consulates are located on the Pali:
 Consulate General of Korea, 2756 Pali Hwy
 Consulate General of the Philippines, 2433 Pali Hwy
 Taipei Economic and Cultural Office, 2746 Pali Hwy

The Pali is also the site of the following houses of worship and religious originations:
 Bentenshu Hawaii Kyokai, 3871 Old Pali Rd
 Saint Stephen Diocesan Center (Roman Catholic), 6301 Pali Hwy
 First Unitarian Church of Honolulu, 2500 Pali Hwy
 Hawaii Conference of Seventh-day Adventists, 2728 Pali Hwy
 Honmon Butsuryushu Hawaii Mission, 3001 Pali Hwy
 Honpa Hongwanji Mission of Hawai'i Betsuin, 1727 Pali Hwy.
 Nuuanu Congregational Church, Pali Hwy
 St. Stephen Church (Roman Catholic), 2747 Pali Hwy
 Soka Gakkai Intl-USA, 2729 Pali Hwy
 Temple Emanu-El (reform), 2550 Pali Hwy
 Tenrikyo Hawaii Dendocho, 2920 Pali Hwy

Names of State Route 61
 "Fort Street" at the intersection of Vineyard Boulevard
 "Pali Highway" (from downtown Honolulu to Castle Junction near Maunawili)
 "Kalanianaole Highway" (from Castle Junction to Castle Medical Center in Kailua
 "Kailua Road" (from Castle Medical Center to central Kailua)

Major intersections

See also

References

External links

0061
Transportation in Honolulu County, Hawaii